High Catton is a village in the East Riding of Yorkshire, England. The village of Low Catton and the River Derwent are 1 mile to the west. Together with Low Catton it forms the civil parish of Catton.

In 1823 High Catton was in the civil parish of Low Catton. Population at the time was 198. Occupations included eleven farmers, a tailor, a joiner & carpenter, a wheelwright, and the landlord of Woodpecker Lass public house. There were also three yeomen. Two carriers operated between the village and York once a week.

References

The Victoria County History; Yorkshire: East Riding.  Vol 3, edited by K.J.Allison, 1976. 

Villages in the East Riding of Yorkshire